Country Style is a chain of coffee shops operating primarily in the Canadian province of Ontario.

Country Style may also refer to:
 Country Style (U.S. TV series), a 1950 American musical variety show 
 Country Style (album), a 1962 album by Ramblin' Jack Elliott
 Country Style, USA, a 1957–1960 series of 15-minute radio and film programs produced by the U.S. Army
 Country Style (Australian TV series), a 1958 Australian television variety show
 Country Style (1964 Australian TV series)